News Items is a 1983 French documentary film, directed by Raymond Depardon, about daily life at police station in the fifth arrondissement of Paris. It was screened in the Un Certain Regard section at the 1983 Cannes Film Festival. It was selected for screening as part of the Cannes Classics section at the 2016 Cannes Film Festival.

References

External links

1983 films
1980s French-language films
French documentary films
Documentary films about law enforcement
Films directed by Raymond Depardon
1983 documentary films
Documentary films about Paris
5th arrondissement of Paris
Law enforcement in France
1980s French films